Duhaney Chinny Williams (born 15 October 1997) is a Jamaican footballer who currently plays as a winger for LA Galaxy II in the USL Championship.

Career

Youth
Williams played as part of the academy team for Sporting Central Academy, who he played in the National Premier League for the club in 2014 and 2015, scoring four goals. He also played at Jamaica College, winning the prestigious Manning Cup and Oliver Shield, scoring over 40 goals throughout his four years. His senior year, was named the MVP of Jamaica College and earned the Golden Boot of the Jamaican Schoolboy Football Inter-Secondary Schools Sports Association.

College & Amateur
In 2017, Williams moved to the United States to play college soccer at Iowa Western Community College, where he made 11 appearances for the Reivers, scoring five goals and tallying two assists, earning First Team All-Conference. He played his sophomore season at Northeast Texas Community College, scoring 12 goals in 21 appearances, where he was awarded First Team All-Region, NJCAA Third Team All-American and NJCAA National Championship All-Tournament. Williams transferred again in 2019, joining Loyola Marymount University, playing three seasons with the Lions, including a truncated season due to the COVID-19 pandemic. Here he made 46 appearances, scoring seven goals and adding seven assists, and was an All-WCC Honorable Mention.

During 2019, Williams also played in the USL PDL with Ocean City Nor'easters, making a single appearance.

Professional
In March 2022, Williams signed with USL Championship club LA Galaxy II. He made his debut for the Galaxy's reserve team on 19 March 2022, appearing as a 79th–minute substitute during a 1–2 loss to San Antonio FC.

References

1997 births
Association football midfielders
Iowa Western Reivers men's soccer players
Jamaican expatriate footballers
Jamaican expatriate sportspeople in the United States
Jamaican footballers
LA Galaxy II players
Living people
Loyola Marymount Lions men's soccer players
Ocean City Nor'easters players
USL Championship players
USL League Two players
People from Clarendon Parish, Jamaica